Shahadebpur Union is a union of Kalihati Upazila, Tangail District, Bangladesh. It is situated 16 km north of Tangail, the district headquarters.

Demographics

According to Population Census 2011 performed by Bangladesh Bureau of Statistics, The total population of Shahadebpur union is 27,036. There are 6,692 households in total.

Education

The literacy rate of Shahadebpur Union is 41.4% (Male: 44.6%, Female: 38.4%).

See also
 Union Councils of Tangail District

References

Populated places in Dhaka Division
Populated places in Tangail District
Unions of Kalihati Upazila